Raymond Leonard Culp (born August 6, 1941) is an American former professional baseball pitcher. He played in Major League Baseball (MLB) for the Philadelphia Phillies  (–), Chicago Cubs, and Boston Red Sox (–).

MLB career
Ray was born in Elgin, Texas. He attended Stephen F. Austin High School (Austin, Texas) and signed as an undrafted free agent with the Philadelphia Phillies when he was 17.
His first year was an impressive one, as he compiled a 14–11 win–loss record for the Phillies and was eighth in the National League (NL) in strikeouts, although his control was somewhat shaky ... leading the league in walks with 102.

As a rookie, he made the  NL All-Star squad and went on to retire Al Kaline, Frank Malzone, and Carl Yastrzemski (around a Leon Wagner single), in a scoreless fifth inning of the Senior Circuit's 5–3 victory.

Culp returned to the All-Star game in 1969, pitching a perfect ninth inning for the American League (AL). He retired Pete Rose (on a foul pop fly) and struck out Randy Hundley and Tony Pérez.

He strung together four steady seasons for the Red Sox from –, winning between 14 and 17 games in each. None of his teams during Culp's career appeared in a postseason game.

In 11 seasons he had a 122–101 win–loss record, 322 games, 268 games started, 80 complete games, 22 shutouts, 21 games finished, 1 save, 1,898 innings pitched, 1,677 hits allowed, 863 runs allowed, 755 earned runs allowed, 188 home runs allowed, 752 walks allowed, 1,411 strikeouts, 70 hit batsmen, 73 wild pitches, 8,066 batters faced, 58 intentional walks, 3 balks, and a 3.58 ERA.

Accomplishments and statistics
Selected by The Sporting News as National League Rookie Pitcher of the Year, 1963
Named to the 1963 National League All-Star Team and the 1969 American League All-Star Team
Led the National League in hit batsmen (12, 1965) the American League (11, 1970)
Led the National League in walks allowed (102) (1963)
Ranks 99th on the MLB career hits allowed per nine innings pitched list (7.95)
Ranks 95th on the MLB career strikeouts per nine innings pitched list (6.69)

References

External links

Ray Culp at SABR (Baseball BioProject)
Ray Culp at Baseball Almanac
Ray Culp at Baseball Biography

1941 births
Living people
Philadelphia Phillies players
Chicago Cubs players
Boston Red Sox players
Major League Baseball pitchers
Baseball players from Texas
National League All-Stars
Johnson City Phillies players
Des Moines Demons players
Asheville Tourists players
Williamsport Grays players
Pawtucket Red Sox players
People from Elgin, Texas